Igor Gennadyevich Avdeev (born 10 January 1973) is a Kazakhstani professional football coach and a former player.

Career

Club
Avdeev played 3 games in the UEFA Cup 1996–97 for FC Alania Vladikavkaz.

International
Avdeev made 27 appearances and scored six goals for the Kazakhstan national football team.

Career statistics

International

Statistics accurate as of match played 14 November 2017

International goals

Scores and results list Tajikistan's goal tally first.

Honours
 Kazakhstani Footballer of the Year: 1999, 2000.

References

External links
 

1973 births
Living people
Kazakhstani footballers
Kazakhstan international footballers
Kazakhstan Premier League players
Russian Premier League players
FC Spartak Vladikavkaz players
FC Lokomotiv Nizhny Novgorod players
FC Astana players
FC Kairat players
FC Shakhter Karagandy players
FC Kyzylzhar players
FC Taraz players
FC Caspiy players
FC Zhenis Astana players
Association football defenders
FC Rotor Volgograd players